Justice Stuart may refer to:

William Z. Stuart, associate justice of the Supreme Court of Indiana
William Corwin Stuart, associate justice of the Iowa Supreme Court
Lyn Stuart, associate justice and acting chief justice of the Alabama Supreme Court

See also
Justice Stewart (disambiguation)